Agrabad Government Colony High School is a secondary school located in south Agrabad, Chittagong, Bangladesh. 

It was established in 1960 by the Chittagong Government Service (C.G.S) Colony. Though it was established for secondary education, it is now a through school, from kindergarten to Secondary School Certificate (SSC). The present headmaster is Shofikullah.

History

This is an old school of port city Chittagong. People of the region Agrabad were searching for a good educational institution for the children of the government service officers and other people of this locality. Eventually, on 3 January 1956, the Agrabad Government Colony Association took a decision to establish a school in this region. And they started a primary school but they did not have a permanent school building. Classes were taken at P.W.D Godown building. Sometimes the classes were taken at a quarter of the colony.

The school started as Junior High School in 1960. Later the P.W.D go-down was used as the main school building. In 1965-66 H. Akbar Ali helped to build the main premise by giving money to the school. He bore most of the expenses for the school building. To give him respect the name of the school auditorium was named after him as 'H. Akbar Ali Hall'. Due to excessive students in school, the auditorium is now used as a classroom. Haji Osman Goni helped by giving money for the school library.

This school was taken under Comilla Board on 1 April 1963 when the number of students of the school was only 79. The first batch of SSC students was enrolled in 1964.

Campus
The school has two campuses. The girls' section is located at Agrabad CGS(Chittagong Government Staff) colony.

The school is one of several in the area that are susceptible to flooding.

Organisation
The school is divided into three sections. These are the kindergarten section, the boy's section and girls section. In kindergarten section, they teach students from play to class five, both boys and girls. For secondary students, there are two school buildings for boys and girls where they study from class six to SSC. About 80 teachers are working for these three sections and the number of students is about 5000 which is the biggest number in Chittagong District. About 1,300 are enrolled in the girls' section. 

Its official ID number is 0203021302.

References

High schools in Bangladesh
Buildings and structures in Agrabad
Schools in Chittagong
1960 establishments in East Pakistan
Educational institutions established in 1960